Bhikhi is a nagar panchayat in Mansa district in the state of Punjab, India.

Geography
It has an average elevation of 219 metres (718 feet).

Demographics
 India census, Bhikhi had a population of 15,078. Males constitute 53% of the population and females 47%. Bhikhi has an average literacy rate of 53%, lower than the national average of 59.5%; with male literacy of 57% and female literacy of 48%. 14% of the population is under 6 years of age.

References

Cities and towns in Mansa district, India